Klaus Berntsen (12 June 1844 – 27 March 1927) was a Danish politician, representing the Liberal party, Venstre. He was Council President of Denmark from 1910 to 1913. He served as minister of defence from 1910 to 1913 and again from 1920 to 1922. He was also minister of the interior from 1908 to 1909.

Biography
He was born on 12 June 1844. He was the father of Aage Berntsen and Oluf Berntsen.

Very early he took part in politics as a quick-witted and popular agitator but belonging to the Moderate Venstre he was for many years without much political influence. After the beginning reunion of the old Venstre groups he played a greater role as a minister that led to the forming of his own cabinet. He was a personal friend of King Frederick VIII and enjoyed the king's support but his government was accused of lacking social understanding. 1913 he proposed the revision of the Constitution that was carried through by the second Zahle Cabinet. When he retired from politics in 1926 he was one of the oldest Danish active parliamentarian politicians ever.

As a member of the Folketing 1873-1884 and again 1886-1926 he remains the longest-serving member of the Danish Parliament and the only member for over 50 years.

He died on 27 March 1927.

References

1844 births
1927 deaths
Danish Defence Ministers
Danish Interior Ministers
Prime Ministers of Denmark
Members of the Folketing
Venstre (Denmark) politicians
People from Nordfyn Municipality